is a former Japanese football player.

Playing career
Shinji Morita played for New Wave Kitakyushu, Tochigi Uva FC, YSCC Yokohama and Grulla Morioka from 2006 to 2014.

References

External links

1987 births
Living people
Association football people from Kanagawa Prefecture
Japanese footballers
J3 League players
Japan Football League players
Giravanz Kitakyushu players
Tochigi City FC players
YSCC Yokohama players
Iwate Grulla Morioka players
Association football midfielders